Herford – Minden-Lübbecke II is an electoral constituency (German: Wahlkreis) represented in the Bundestag. It elects one member via first-past-the-post voting. Under the current constituency numbering system, it is designated as constituency 133. It is located in eastern North Rhine-Westphalia, comprising the Herford district and a small part of the Minden-Lübbecke district.

Herford – Minden-Lübbecke II was created for the inaugural 1949 federal election. Since 2009, it has been represented by Stefan Schwartze of the Social Democratic Party (SPD).

Geography
Herford – Minden-Lübbecke II is located in eastern North Rhine-Westphalia. As of the 2021 federal election, it comprises the entirety of the Herford district and the municipality of Bad Oeynhausen from the Minden-Lübbecke district.

History
Herford – Minden-Lübbecke II was created in 1949, then known as Herford-Stadt und -Land. From 1965 through 1994, it was named Herford. In the 1998 election, it was named Herford – Minden-Lübbecke I. It acquired its current name in the 2002 election. In the 1949 election, it was North Rhine-Westphalia constituency 48 in the numbering system. From 1953 through 1976, it was number 107. From 1980 through 1998, it was number 103. From 2002 through 2009, it was number 134. Since 2013, it has been number 133.

Originally, the constituency comprised the independent city of Herford and the district of Landkreis Herford. In the 1972 and 1976 elections, it comprised the district of Herford and the municipality of Kalletal from the Lippe district. In the 1980 through 1994 elections, it was coterminous with the Herford district. In the 1998 election, it comprised the Herford district and the Ortsteile of Bad Oeynhausen-Lohe and Bad Oeynhausen-Rehme from the Minden-Lübbecke district. It acquired its current borders in the 2002 election.

Members
The constituency has been held by the Social Democratic Party (SPD) during all but one Bundestag term since 1949. It was first represented by Heinrich Höcker of the SPD from 1949 to 1961, followed by Rudolf Bäumer for a single term. Günter Biermann served from 1965 to 1983, when Heinz Landré of the Christian Democratic Union (CDU) was elected. Rolf Koltzsch regained the constituency for the SPD in 1987 and served until 1994. Wolfgang Spanier then served until 2009. Stefan Schwartze was elected in 2009, and re-elected in 2013, 2017, and 2021.

Election results

2021 election

2017 election

2013 election

2009 election

References

Federal electoral districts in North Rhine-Westphalia
1949 establishments in West Germany
Constituencies established in 1949
Herford (district)
Minden-Lübbecke